The canton of Aizenay is an administrative division of the Vendée department, western France. It was created at the French canton reorganisation which came into effect in March 2015. Its seat is in Aizenay.

It consists of the following communes:
 
Aizenay
Beaufou
Bellevigny
La Genétouze
L'Herbergement
Les Lucs-sur-Boulogne
Montréverd
Le Poiré-sur-Vie
Rocheservière
Saint-Denis-la-Chevasse
Saint-Philbert-de-Bouaine

References

Cantons of Vendée